Sagaponack Historic District is a national historic district located at Sagaponack in Suffolk County, New York. There are 131 contributing buildings, one contributing site, and three contributing structures.  It includes residences, farm complexes, agricultural buildings, the Sagaponack School, and the General Store / Post Office.  Dwellings reflect residential development from Sagaponack's early settlement in the 17th century, Federal and Greek Revival style residences of the early to mid-18th century, popular revival styles of the mid- to late-19th century, and early 20th century American Foursquare and Bungalow styles,

It was added to the National Register of Historic Places in 2000.

References

Historic districts on the National Register of Historic Places in New York (state)
Federal architecture in New York (state)
Historic districts in Suffolk County, New York
National Register of Historic Places in Suffolk County, New York